Oleksii Vitaliiovych Voitsekhovskyi (born May 10, 1987) is a Ukrainian ice hockey forward currently playing in the Turkish Ice Hockey Super League for Zeytinburnu Belediyespor. He was a member of the Ukraine national junior team.

Playing career

Club
Voytsekhovsky began his ice hockey career at hie hometown club HK Kyiv in 2002 appearing in the regional Eastern European Hockey League B, which was formed by the neighboring countries Belarus, Latvia, Lithuania and Ukraine. He then played for HK Gomel-2 (2004–2005), Sokil Kyiv-2 and Sokil Kyiv in his country before he moved to Kazakhstan to join Gornyak Rudny (2009–10) and then Kazakhmys Satpaev (2010–11). In 2011, he returned home to play for the teams Sokil Kyiv-2, Sokil Kyiv, HK Kryzhynka Kompanion, HC Donbass-2, Kharkivski Akuly and Bilyy Bars Brovary. In 2014, he signed a contract with the Istanbul-based club Zeytinburnu BSK to play in the Turkish Ice Hockey Super League.

He enjoyed winning twice the champion title in the 2014–15 and 2015–16 Turkish Super League seasons. His team won the first round of the 2016–17 IIHF Continental Cup and advanced to the second round.

International
Voytsekhovsky was a member of the Ukraine national U-18 team and took part at the IIHF World U18 Championships in 2004 Division II and 2005 Division I.

With the Ukraine national junior team he appeared at the IIHF World U20 Championship in 2004, 2005 Division I and 2006 Division I.

Honours

Club
  2007–08 Ukrainian Hockey Championship Sokil Kyiv-2,
  2008–09 Ukrainian Hockey Championship Sokil Kyiv,
  2011–12 Professional Hockey League season Sokil Kyiv,
  2013–14 Ukrainian Hockey Championship Sokil Kyiv,
 2014–15 Turkish Ice Hockey Super League Zeytinburnu BSK,
 2015–16 Turkish Ice Hockey Super League Zeytinburnu BSK,
 2016–17 IIHF Continental Cup – First round Zeytinburnu BSK.

International
 2004 IIHF World U18 Championship Division II,
 2005 IIHF World U18 Championship Division I,

References

Living people
1987 births
Sportspeople from Kyiv
Ukrainian ice hockey forwards
Ukrainian expatriate sportspeople in Belarus
Ukrainian expatriate sportspeople in Russia
HK Gomel players
Sokil Kyiv players
Ukrainian expatriate sportspeople in Kazakhstan
Gornyak Rudny players
Kazakhmys Satpaev players
HC Donbass players
Ukrainian expatriate sportspeople in Turkey
Expatriate ice hockey players in Turkey
Zeytinburnu Belediyespor players
Competitors at the 2013 Winter Universiade